Voievodyn waterfall is located on the Voievodyn River, about  from the village of Tura Perechynsky, Perechyn Raion, Zakarpattia Oblast of western Ukraine.

See also
 Waterfalls of Ukraine
 http://www.turystam.in.ua 1 and 2

Waterfalls of Ukraine